The Xenodiscidae are the earliest of the Ceratitida and comprise Middle and Upper Permian genera characterized by compressed, discoidal, evolute shells with rounded to acute venters and commonly with lateral ribs. Sutures are goniatitic to weakly ceratitic.

The Xenodiscidae, which are part of the superfamily Xenodiscoidea, are derived from the Daraelitidae, a family in the Prolecanitida (ibid). In turn, the Xenodiscidae provided the root stock for the subsequent expansion and diversification of the Ceratitida in the Triassic.

Notes

References
 Arkell et al., 1957; Mesozoic Ammonoidea, Treatise on Invertebrate Paleontology, Part-L, Ammonoidea; Geological Soc. of America, reprinted 1990. 
 The Paleobiology Database July 2009

 
Xenodiscoidea
Ceratitida families
Guadalupian first appearances
Lopingian extinctions